In American football, a player informally known as a change-of-pace running back is a substitute for the starting running back, usually a player who is a better wide receiver or outside runner than the starter but not necessarily better overall.  The idea is that the other team's defense has been designed to stop the starting running back, but may be less well prepared for the substitute player.  The change-of-pace back is usually not just a backup, who might have similar characteristics to the team's top running back, but is someone who forces the opposing defense to change its strategy when he is on the field.

References

American football positions